1379 Lomonosowa is a stony background asteroid from the central regions of the asteroid belt, approximately  in diameter. Discovered by Grigory Neujmin at the Simeiz Observatory in 1936, the asteroid was later named after Russian physicist and astronomer Mikhail Lomonosov.

Discovery 

Lomonosowa was discovered on 19 March 1936, by Soviet astronomer Grigory Neujmin at the Simeiz Observatory on the Crimean peninsula. On the same night, it was independently discovered by Serbian astronomer Petar Đurković at Uccle Observatory in Belgium. The Minor Planet Center only recognizes the first discoverer. A first precovery of Lomonosowa was taken at the Lowell Observatory in October 1905.

Orbit and classification 

Lomonosowa is a non-family asteroid of the main belt's background population. It orbits the Sun in the central asteroid belt at a distance of 2.3–2.8 AU once every 4.01 years (1,464 days). Its orbit has an eccentricity of 0.09 and an inclination of 16° with respect to the ecliptic. The body's observation arc begins with its first precovery at Lowell Observatory in October 1905.

Naming 

This minor planet was named after Russian physicist and astronomer Mikhail Lomonosov (1711–1765). He discovered the atmosphere of Venus and the principle of mass conservation. The official  was published by the Minor Planet Center in June 1955. He is also honored by the craters Lomonosov on the Moon and Lomonosov on Mars.

Physical characteristics 

Lomonosowa has been characterized as a common, stony S-type asteroid.

Lightcurves 

Several rotational lightcurve of Lomonosowa have been obtained from photometric observations since the 1980s. Lightcurve analysis gave a rotation period between 24.482 and 24.71 hours with a brightness amplitude of 0.45 to 0.63 magnitude. The asteroid's lightcurve has also been modeled using photometric observations from various sources. Modelling gave a concurring sidereal period of 24.4845 and 24.4846 hours. One study also found two spin axis of (72.0°, −84.0°) and (265.0°, −46.0°) in ecliptic coordinates (λ, β).

Diameter and albedo 

According to the surveys carried out by the Japanese Akari satellite and the NEOWISE mission of NASA's Wide-field Infrared Survey Explorer, Lomonosowa measures between 18.690 and 20.45 kilometers in diameter and its surface has an albedo between 0.1584 and 0.218. The Collaborative Asteroid Lightcurve Link assumes a standard albedo for stony asteroids of 0.20 and derives a diameter of 17.82 kilometers based on an absolute magnitude of 11.11.

References

External links 
 Lightcurve Database Query (LCDB), at www.minorplanet.info
 Dictionary of Minor Planet Names, Google books
 Asteroids and comets rotation curves, CdR – Geneva Observatory, Raoul Behrend
 Discovery Circumstances: Numbered Minor Planets (1)-(5000) – Minor Planet Center
 
 

001379
Discoveries by Grigory Neujmin
Named minor planets
19360319